José Rodríguez (born 19 March 1910, date of death unknown) was an Argentine foil fencer. He competed at the 1948 and 1952 Summer Olympics.

References

1910 births
Year of death missing
Argentine male foil fencers
Olympic fencers of Argentina
Fencers at the 1948 Summer Olympics
Fencers at the 1952 Summer Olympics
Pan American Games medalists in fencing
Pan American Games gold medalists for Argentina
Pan American Games silver medalists for Argentina
Fencers at the 1951 Pan American Games
Medalists at the 1951 Pan American Games
20th-century Argentine people